Pascale Boistard (born 4 January 1971) is a French politician and former State Secretary for Women's Rights. A member of the Socialist Party, she represented the Somme's 1st constituency.

References

1971 births
Living people
Socialist Party (France) politicians
Deputies of the 14th National Assembly of the French Fifth Republic
Women government ministers of France
21st-century French women